John Nicholson,  (2 November 1867 – 16 September 1941) was a lawyer and politician in Western Australia. Born in Partick, Glasgow, Scotland, he travelled to WA in 1896. Nicholson was a Perth City Councillor from 1901 to 1914, and was the mayor in 1915. On 23 March 1918 he was elected as a member of the Western Australia Legislative Council, representing the Metropolitan Province until his death on 16 September 1941.

References

Further reading

1867 births
1941 deaths
20th-century Australian politicians
Mayors and Lord Mayors of Perth, Western Australia
Members of the Western Australian Legislative Council
Scottish emigrants to Australia
Australian Officers of the Order of the British Empire